American recording artist, writer and musician Nick Jonas has recorded material for five studio albums (including one with The Administration), one extended play, multiple soundtrack albums, multiple remixes, two charity singles, three covers and he has also collaborated with several other artists on songs for their albums. In 2008 and again in 2009 he recorded a solo song which appeared on two different Jonas Brothers albums.
In 2017 he added his first two original written and recorded songs for a movie.

Songs

Unreleased songs

Demo songs

Notes

See also 
List of songs recorded by Jonas Brothers

References

External links 

Nick Jonas on AllMusic

 
Nick Jonas
Jonas Brothers